La prima notte di quiete is a 1972 romantic drama film directed by Valerio Zurlini. It stars Alain Delon, Sonia Petrovna, Renato Salvatori, Alida Valli, Adalberto Maria Merli, Salvo Randone and Lea Massari. The version released in France and West Germany runs less than the Italian cut.

The film tells the story of a gifted but restless young man who cannot live up to the high traditions of his family and survives in obscurity, taking casual teaching jobs and living in a loveless partnership with a depressed woman. His aimless existence reaches a crisis point when he falls for one of his pupils, a beautiful but badly damaged girl.

Plot
While a teacher is on sick leave, despite his dishevelled appearance and an employment history with unexplained gaps, Daniele is hired to take a class in Rimini. To get to know his pupils, he asks them to write a free essay or, if they prefer, one on the writer Manzoni. To his surprise, only one chooses the latter, the quiet and very attractive Vanina, who increasingly absorbs his attention. He talks to her when he can and gives her the book Vanina Vanini by Stendhal. In his free time, he leaves his partner Monica to herself (they sleep apart) while he gets to know a group of local men who enjoy drinking, gambling, recreational drugs, fast cars and easy women. Prominent among them are a crooked businessman Gerardo, who drives an ostentatious Lamborghini and is the lover of Vanina, and Spider, a gay pharmacist who is secretly a devout Catholic and lover of poetry.

Daniele takes the withdrawn Vanina to see a wall painting by Piero della Francesca and on the way back they share a kiss. When Spider's birthday comes round, after going to a disco where Vanina sulks and will not dance, the group end up at Gerardo's luxurious house. In revenge he shows a home movie, which starts innocently with Vanina on holiday but turns into a sex tape. She switches off the electricity and Gerardo asks everybody to leave. Next day Vanina does not turn up at school and Daniele goes to the house of her mother, who with threats warns him to stay away from her daughter. Going home, he faces trouble from Monica, who tolerates his evenings out with other men but not his growing obsession over his pupil. In addition, Spider has fallen in love with him and has found a book of poems he wrote called The First Night of Stillness. When Spider asks the significance of the title, Daniele says it is taken from Goethe: after you die, you have your first night without dreams.

Another friend Marcello, a real estate agent with empty properties to sell, takes Daniele to a solitary house by the sea he has allowed Vanina to hide in. After Daniele and Vanina have made love, they are woken by a furious Gerardo who has been looking for his runaway lover. He tells Daniele that Vanina was a child prostitute, managed by her mother, who has been enjoyed by most men in town and some women too. Daniele then gets the better of him in a fight and he leaves.

Putting Vanina on a train to stay with her sister, Daniele goes home to tell Monica he is leaving her, to which she replies that she will kill herself. On his way to join Vanina, he stops at a bar to ring Monica, but she does not reply and as he leaves he is professionally beaten up by the lover of Vanina's mother. Rescued by Marcello, he is looked after by Spider. Injured and upset, he drives fast and erratically through the fog. Again getting no response from Monica's telephone, he decides to return to her but is hit by a truck and killed. The only character to go to his funeral, in the private chapel of his family's country mansion, is Spider. There he discovers that Daniele was the only child of a war hero who was killed at El Alamein.

Cast
 Alain Delon as Daniele Dominici
 Sonia Petrovna as Vanina Abati
 Giancarlo Giannini as Spider
 Lea Massari as Monica, Dominici's partner
 Adalberto Maria Merli as Gerardo Pavani
 Salvo Randone as the headmaster
 Alida Valli as Vanina's mother
 Renato Salvatori as Marcello
 Nicoletta Rizzi as Elvira
 Fabrizio Moroni as Fabrizio Romani, student
 Sandro Moretti as Leo Montanari
 Liana Del Balzo as Daniele's mother
 Patrizia Adiutori as Valeria
 Carla Mancini as female student
 Krista Nell as Martine

Production
Delon and the director clashed during filmmaking.

Reception
The film was a mild success in France, but was the seventh most popular film of the year in Italy.

Notes

References

External links
 
 Review at the San Diego Reader

1972 films
1972 romantic drama films
Films about scandalous teacher–student relationships
Films scored by Mario Nascimbene
Films shot in Tuscany
Films shot in Venice
French romantic drama films
1970s Italian-language films
Italian romantic drama films
Titanus films
1970s Italian films
1970s French films